Coventry High School can refer to:

Coventry High School (Coventry, Connecticut)
Coventry High School (Coventry Township, Ohio)
Coventry High School (Rhode Island)